Rhode Island Comic Con (RICC) is a three-day comic convention held during November at the Rhode Island Convention Center, Amica Mutual Pavilion, and Omni Providence Hotel in Providence, Rhode Island. The convention was Rhode Island's first Comic Con. Organizers also run Terror Con, a horror convention at the same location.

Programming
The convention typically offers artists, celebrity guests, cars, comic book authors, a costume contest, gaming, kids-con, professional wrestlers, vendors, video game tournaments, and voice artists. In 2013, the convention also hosted several wedding ceremonies. The 2018 event brought an estimated $4.2 million to the area's economy.

History
Rhode Island Comic Con held its first event in 2012 at the Rhode Island Convention Center and took two years to prepare. David Anders, Anthony Michael Hall, Madison Lintz, Jett Lucas, Nichelle Nichols, Chanel Ryan, and Raphael Sbarge could not make it to the 2013 convention due to the 2013 Los Angeles International Airport shooting. A Halloween party was held on Friday before the convention in 2014. The fire marshal shutdown RICC temporarily on Saturday due to over capacity caused by poor attendance flow. Rhode Island Convention Center has a maximum occupancy of 17,000 and attendance at the time of shutdown was over 20,000. It was the first time in Rhode Island Convention Center history a shutdown due to over capacity occurred. An estimated 1,500 or more attendees were unable to enter the convention. Many were attendees who left the convention but could not re-enter. The attendees in line suffered from poor weather conditions and chants for refunds began. Attendees were later allowed to enter in small groups (100 people) or could exchange tickets for Sunday. Refunds were later issued for attendees who purchased tickets but could not enter the convention. Crowding was also caused by the convention's 50 percent growth, not using all available space, and the convention center not being prepared for attendees to stay so long. Sunday did not experience the same levels of crowding and ticket sales were capped.

Prior to the 2015, RICC changed its press policy due to concerns that it limited negative free speech about the event. The convention made several changes to prevent overcrowding issues in 2015. The changes included expanding to the Dunkin' Donuts Center, increasing to three days, ticket scanning to accurately know attendance figures, a 17,000 ticket sales cap per day, and increased vendor food supply. Carrie Fisher cancelled her 2015 appearance due to illness. Jorge Elorza, the mayor of Providence, participated in the Comic Con's opening ceremony. Saturday's ticket sales for Rhode Island Comic Con stopped at 10:30 a.m. The convention in 2015 had over 500 volunteers. Before 2016's convention, Kate Beckinsale canceled her appearance due to work commitments. Friday and Saturday tickets sold out for the 2016 convention. "Rhode Warrior", the conventions comic book, launched at the 2016 event. Due to issues with photo ops after 2016, a different company was used in 2017, and RICC added ballroom space (Narragansett Ballrooms) in the Omni Providence Hotel. Additional line space was added in a large tent behind the Dunkin' Donuts Center.

Several major guests cancelled before the 2017 convention, including Jon Bernthal, Richard Dreyfuss, Lennie James, Tom Payne, Khary Payton, Norman Reedus, and Mark Ruffalo. Several Walking Dead guests had to cancel their appearance due to shooting delays on the season finale. The convention's ticket sales were limited to 17,000 per day, with Saturday being sold out. RICC also added the Geekfest film festival and a Gene Simmons concert at the Veterans Memorial Auditorium. The convention used the Omni Providence Hotel for almost all panel content in 2018. An additional entrance was also added to the convention to reduce wait times. Rhode Island Comic Con 2020 and Rhode Island Comic Con Summer Edition 2021 were cancelled due to the COVID-19 pandemic. The 2021 convention had mask requirements, but enforcement was poor.

Event history

References

External links
Rhode Island Comic Con

Comics conventions in the United States
Recurring events established in 2012
2012 establishments in Rhode Island
Annual events in Rhode Island
Festivals in Rhode Island
Tourist attractions in Providence County, Rhode Island
Culture of Providence, Rhode Island
Tourist attractions in Providence, Rhode Island
Conventions in Rhode Island